Pavlo Pavliuk, or Pavlo Mikhnovych (died 1638 in Warsaw). He was a Colonel in the Registered Cossacks, was appointed by Cossacks as a hetman, and was the leader of a cossack-peasant uprising (the Pavlyuk Uprising) in Left-bank Ukraine and Zaporizhia.

The peasant uprising against the abuses of the nobility and magnates of Polish–Lithuanian Commonwealth was sparked by several Cossacks being expelled from the Cossack Registry. Mikhnovych ordered the captured commanders of the Registered Cossacks to be executed and issued a declaration, in which he proclaimed a fight against the "masters" (pany). 

The forces of Polish Crown Hetman Mikołaj Potocki (nicknamed "Bearpaw") in 1637 defeated the Cossacks  in the Battle of Kumeyki, and Pavlyuk surrendered near Borovytsia on December 20. The General sejm wanted Pavlyuk to be executed for rebellion using the usual method of making him look like a jester by putting a heated crown on his head and putting a heated sceptre in his hands. In February 1638, the king's representative Adam Kisiel said that the insurgents had not fought to the death, but had voluntarily surrendered because they had trusted him to be merciful. The King abolished the heated crown and sceptre execution method, and Pavlyuk was instead brought to Warsaw, tried and executed. The remnants of his forces capitulated near Borovytsia soon afterwards and he was succeeded in his command of Registered Cossacks by colonel Ilyash Karaimovich.

Sources 
  Новицький Іван. Адам Кисіль, воєвода київський // В. Щербак (упорядник, автор передмови). Коли земля стогнала. — К.: Наукова думка, 1995. — 432 с. — С. 319–382.  

1638 deaths
Pavlyuk
Pavlyuk
Year of birth unknown